Boopiidae is a family of lice in the order Psocodea. There are about 8 genera and more than 50 described species in Boopiidae.

Genera
These eight genera belong to the family Boopiidae:
 Boopia Piaget, 1880
 Heterodoxus Le Souef & Bullen, 1902
 Latumcephalum Le Souef, 1902
 Macropophila Mjoberg, 1919
 Paraboopia Werneck & Thompson, 1940
 Paraheterodoxus Harrison & Johnston, 1916
 Phacogalia Mjoberg, 1919
 Therodoxus Clay, 1971

References

Further reading

 

Troctomorpha
Lice
Insect families